Brainard is an unincorporated community in Humboldt County, California.

References

Unincorporated communities in Humboldt County, California
Unincorporated communities in California
Populated coastal places in California